The 2014 Trophée des Champions was the 19th edition of the French supercup. The match was played at the Workers Stadium in Beijing, China. This was the sixth consecutive time the competition has taken place on foreign soil, and its first time in Asia.

The match was between Paris Saint-Germain, the winners of the 2013-14 Ligue 1 season, and the 2014 Coupe de France Final winners En Avant Guingamp. Paris Saint-Germain were the defending champions, having defeated Bordeaux in the 2013 edition, which was played in Gabon. They successfully defended their trophy by defeating Guingamp 2–0, their fourth victory in eight editions of the tournament.

Match

Summary
In the 9th minute, Zlatan Ibrahimović opened the scoring by controlling Javier Pastore's pass with his heel and then volleying the ball. Ten minutes later, Ibrahimović doubled PSG's lead with a penalty after Lars Jacobsen brought down Hervin Ongenda. After 32 minutes, Guingamp had a chance with their own penalty, after Marquinhos fouled Claudio Beauvue, but Mustapha Yatabaré's shot was saved by Salvatore Sirigu.

Details

References

External links 
 Official site  

Trophee des champions
2014
Paris Saint-Germain F.C. matches
En Avant Guingamp matches
International club association football competitions hosted by China
August 2014 sports events in China
2014 in Chinese football
2010s in Beijing
Football in Beijing
Sports competitions in Beijing